Quiros or Quirós may refer to:

People

 Adolfo Quirós (1853–1910), Chilean poet and public servant
Álvaro Quirós (born 1983), Spanish professional golfer.
Bernaldo de Quirós (1675–1710), Spanish writer
Carlos S. Quirós (born 1932), Puerto Rican politician
Edgar Quirós, Spanish paralympic swimmer
Heriberto Quirós (born 1972), Costa Rican football (soccer) player
Ignacio Quirós (1931–1999), Argentine actor
Juan Bautista Quirós Segura (1853–1934), Costa Rican military officer and politician
José Pablo Quirós Quirós (1905–1988), Costa Rican diplomat, son of Juan Bautista Quirós Segura
Pedro Fernández de Quirós (1565–1614), Portuguese navigator in the service of Spain.
Pedro Quirós Jiménez (1819–1883), Costa Rican military officer and politician
 Tomás Bernaldo de Quirós, sailor who served as governor of Florida between 1578 and 1579. He was also acting governor of Santa Elena between, at least, 1577 and November 1580.

Other
 Quirós, municipality in Asturias, Spain
 Quirós, Catamarca, village and municipality in Catamarca Province, in Argentina
 , a United States Navy gunboat in commission from 1900 to 1904, from 1904 to 1908, and from 1910 to 1923 which previously served in the Spanish Navy from 1896 to 1898 as Quirós